Hospitals in Omaha, Nebraska have been integral to the city's growth since its founding in 1857. The city has a number of hospitals that were founded by religious groups, and has many medical centers resultant from the mergers of various hospitals. Nebraska is also home to a VA facility that was the only hospital in the United States with a nuclear reactor.

History

St. Joseph's Hospital is the oldest healthcare facility in Omaha. The Sisters of Mercy opened the original facility on September 1, 1870. John A. Creighton established the John A. Creighton Medical College and provided funding to the hospital in 1892. It was originally located on lots donated by the Creighton family at 10th and Castelar Streets. A new building was opened at 30th and California Streets that combined both facilities.

The original Immanuel Hospital was located at North 34th and Meredith Avenues in North Omaha. Built alongside the Nazareth Home, the hospital was built in 1890. The four-story brick, gothic structure was severely damaged in a wind storm in early March, 1902. The original Clarkson Memorial Hospital was constructed in 1909 at 2100 Howard Street. Its five stories housed up to 80 patients.

The Douglas County Hospital was planned in 1887. Finished in May 1892, the building was rehabilitated in 1894, due to sub-standard materials and building practices. The original Methodist Episcopal Hospital, located at 20th and Harney Streets, was opened on March 3, 1891. Operated by the Methodist Episcopal Church, the hospital opened at 3612 Cuming Street in 1908, with a capacity to treat 2,000 patients per year. The hospital moved to 84th and West Dodge Road in 1968.

Historic hospitals

The Fort Omaha Hospital was opened in 1878 to care for soldiers wounded during the Indian Wars.  Built along with several other notable buildings at the Fort, the hospital operated through the 1940s. The Ford Hospital in Omaha was built in 1916. It was a privately operated hospital built and operated by Dr. Michael J. Ford that operated until 1922. Ford was the last small, private hospital in the city. The Nicholas Senn Hospital was located at Park Avenue and Dewey Streets in Midtown Omaha. When it opened on February 1, 1912, the hospital was a modern, 60-bed building that featured one of the "finest x-ray machines in the U.S." Dr. Nicholas Senn, a member of the Rush Medical College in Chicago, Illinois, was the hospital's namesake. The Omaha Christian Institute founded Omaha's General Hospital in 1908. Sold to a private company in 1910, it was renamed Lord Lister Hospital. Located at 14th & Capitol Avenue, the building had 88 beds and treated 1,200 patients annually.

Rabbi Isaac Meyer Wise, founder of American Reform Judaism, was the namesake of Wise Memorial Hospital, which was located at 406 South 24th Street. Sited on a lot donated by the wife of J.L. Brandeis, the facility was built in 1912 for $125,000. Between 1912 and 1917 the hospital treated more than 1,000 patients. In 1930, the institution closed, with the Lutheran Hospital Association purchasing the facility and opening Lutheran Hospital there 1931. St. Catherine's Hospital and Evangelical Covenant Hospital were other religiously affiliated hospitals in Omaha.

List of hospitals

See also
 Nebraska Methodist Health System
 CHI Health
 Historic companies in Omaha, Nebraska
 Nebraska Medicine
 University of Nebraska Medical Center

References

 
Healthcare in Omaha, Nebraska